Reggina Calcio extended its stay in Serie A by a further season, despite being charged with involvement in Calciopoli at the end of the term. Reggina was allowed to retain its Serie A status, but was demoted eleven points out of its 2006-07 campaign, leading to the general consensus that its time in the top-flight division was running out, given that it had only sealed its Serie A stays by the shallowest of margins before.

Squad

Goalkeepers
  Ivan Pelizzoli
  Nicola Pavarini
  Antonino Saviano
  Pietro Marino

Defenders
  Juriy Cannarsa
  Antonio Giosa
  Alessandro Lucarelli
  Ivan Franceschini
  Francesco Modesto
  Gaetano De Rosa
  Gaetano Ungaro
  Maurizio Lanzaro

Midfielders
  Carlos Paredes
  Bruno Lança de Andrade
  Luca Rigoni
  Davide Biondini
  Francesco Cozza
  Luca Vigiani
  Giacomo Tedesco
  Giandomenico Mesto
  Filippo Carobbio
  Ivan Castiglia
  Antonino Barillà
  Demetrio Cutrupi
  Simone Missiroli

Attackers
  Rolando Bianchi
  Nicola Amoruso
  Lampros Choutos
  Fabio Ceravolo
  Ilyos Zeytulayev
  Simone Cavalli

Serie A

Matches

 Reggina-Roma 0-3
 0-1 Mancini (30)
 0-2 Daniele De Rossi (46)
 0-3 Shabani Nonda (90 + 2)
 Sampdoria-Reggina 3-2
 1-0 Emiliano Bonazzoli (18)
 1-1 Francesco Cozza (28)
 2-1 Sergio Volpi (58)
 3-1 Andrea Gasbarroni (85)
 3-2 Simone Missiroli (90 + 3)
 Reggina-Chievo 1-3
 1-0 Francesco Cozza (11)
 1-1 Daniele Franceschini (19)
 1-2 Daniele Franceschini (64)
 1-3 Davide Mandelli (77)
 Palermo-Reggina 1-0
 1-0 Christian Terlizzi (66)
 Reggina-Udinese 2-0
 1-0 Francesco Cozza (42)
 2-0 Simone Cavalli (76)
 Milan-Reggina 2-1
 1-0 Paolo Maldini (5)
 2-0 Paolo Maldini (20)
 2-1 Simone Cavalli (90 + 2)
 Reggina-Lecce 2-0
 1-0 Giacomo Tedesco (14)
 2-0 Francesco Cozza (52)
 Livorno-Reggina 1-0
 1-0 Cristiano Lucarelli (87)
 Reggina-Treviso 1-2
 0-1 Luigi Beghetto (18)
 0-2 Francesco Parravicini (78)
 1-2 Simone Missiroli (86)
 Reggina-Lazio 1-0
 1-0 Luciano Zauri (78 og)
 Empoli-Reggina 3-0
 1-0 Christian Riganò (7)
 2-0 Francesco Tavano (67)
 3-0 Ighli Vannucchi (90 + 4)
 Reggina-Cagliari 3-1
 1-0 Nicola Amoruso (2)
 2-0 Francesco Cozza (38)
 2-1 Nelson Abeijón (67)
 3-1 Carlos Paredes (81)
 Siena-Reggina 0-0
 Reggina-Parma 2-1
 1-0 Francesco Cozza (10)
 1-1 Giuseppe Cardone (13)
 2-1 Gaetano De Rosa (21)
 Ascoli-Reggina 1-1
 1-0 Michele Fini (60)
 1-1 Carlos Paredes (88)
 Reggina-Inter 0-4
 0-1 Iván Córdoba (2)
 0-2 Obafemi Martins (15)
 0-3 Adriano (40)
 0-4 David Pizarro (90 + 2)
 Messina-Reggina 1-1
 1-0 Arturo Di Napoli (25)
 1-1 Francesco Cozza (86)
 Reggina-Fiorentina 1-1
 1-0 Alessandro Lucarelli (12)
 1-1 Martin Jørgensen (13)
 Juventus-Reggina 1-0
 1-0 Alessandro Del Piero (45)
 Roma-Reggina 3-1
 1-0 Francesco Totti (4)
 2-0 Francesco Totti (65)
 2-1 Ivan Franceschini (90 + 1)
 3-1 Mancini (90 + 3)
 Reggina-Sampdoria 2-1
 1-0 Carlos Paredes (7)
 1-1 Vitali Kutuzov (44)
 2-1 Nicola Amoruso (46 pen)
 Chievo-Reggina 4-0
 1-0 Amauri (2)
 2-0 Sergio Pellissier (30)
 3-0 Amauri (43 pen)
 4-0 Sergio Pellissier (90 + 4)
 Reggina-Palermo 2-2
 0-1 Simone Barone (42)
 1-1 Gaetano De Rosa (45 + 4)
 1-2 Andrea Caracciolo (80)
 2-2 Carlos Paredes (90 + 2)
 Udinese-Reggina 1-2
 1-0 Vincenzo Iaquinta (15)
 1-1 Nicola Amoruso (46)
 1-2 Nicola Amoruso (61)
 Reggina-Milan 1-4
 1-0 Carlos Paredes (9)
 1-1 Filippo Inzaghi (14)
 1-2 Alberto Gilardino (37)
 1-3 Filippo Inzaghi (52)
 1-4 Filippo Inzaghi (90 + 3)
 Lecce-Reggina 0-0
 Reggina-Livorno 1-1
 0-1 Stefano Morrone (46)
 1-1 Francesco Cozza (63)
 Treviso-Reggina 0-1
 0-1 Nicola Amoruso (90 + 4)
 Lazio-Reggina 3-1
 1-0 Paolo Di Canio (25)
 2-0 Tommaso Rocchi (36)
 3-0 Goran Pandev (68)
 3-1 Nicola Amoruso (69)
 Reggina-Empoli 0-2
 0-1 Nicola Pozzi (62)
 0-2 Francesco Tavano (82)
 Cagliari-Reggina 0-2
 0-1 Alessandro Lucarelli (8)
 0-2 Giacomo Tedesco (20)
 Reggina-Siena 1-1
 0-1 Erjon Bogdani (21)
 1-1 Nicola Amoruso (51)
 Parma-Reggina 4-0
 1-0 Mark Bresciano (12)
 2-0 Fábio Simplício (34)
 3-0 Matteo Contini (66 pen)
 4-0 Daniele Dessena (79)
 Reggina-Ascoli 2-0
 1-0 Gaetano De Rosa (10)
 2-0 Nicola Amoruso (27)
 Inter-Reggina 4-0
 1-0 Julio Cruz (16)
 2-0 Obafemi Martins (23)
 3-0 César (28)
 4-0 Julio Cruz (90 + 2)
 Reggina-Messina 3-0
 1-0 Francesco Cozza (51)
 2-0 Nicola Amoruso (57 pen)
 3-0 Rolando Bianchi (76)
 Fiorentina-Reggina 5-2
 1-0 Stefano Fiore (25)
 2-0 Luca Toni (28)
 3-0 Martin Jørgensen (35)
 4-0 Luca Toni (64)
 5-0 Valeri Bojinov (65)
 5-1 Nicola Amoruso (81)
 5-2 Nicola Amoruso (84 pen)
 Reggina-Juventus 0-2
 0-1 David Trezeguet (23)
 0-2 Alessandro Del Piero (90 + 1)

Topscorers
  Nicola Amoruso 11
  Francesco Cozza 9
  Carlos Paredes 5
  Gaetano De Rosa 3

References

Reggina 1914 seasons
Reggina